is a passenger railway station located in the city of Koganei, Tokyo, Japan, operated by East Japan Railway Company (JR East).

Lines
Higashi-Koganei Station is served by the Chuo Line (Rapid) Service.

Station layout
The station has one elevated side platform and one elevated island platform serving three tracks, with the station building located underneath. The station had a Midori no Madoguchi staffed ticket office.

Platforms

History
The station opened on September 10, 1964. Freight operations from the station began from April 1965, and continued until 1984. The station became part of the JR East network after the privatization of Japanese National Railways (JNR) on April 1, 1987.

Passenger statistics
In fiscal 2019, the station was used by an average of 31,758 passengers daily (boarding passengers only). The passenger figures for previous years are as shown below.

Surrounding area
 Tokyo University of Agriculture and Technology
 Hosei University
 Asia University
 International Christian University
 Japan Lutheran College
 Tokyo Union Theological Seminary
 Tokyo University of Electro-Communications
 Studio Ghibli (animation company)
 Gainax (animation company)
 Feel (animation company)
 Koganei Park
 Edo-Tokyo Open Air Architectural Museum

See also

 List of railway stations in Japan

References

External links

JR East station information 

Railway stations in Tokyo
Railway stations in Japan opened in 1964
Chūō Main Line
Koganei, Tokyo